Spoil Engine is a four-piece metal band from Belgium, formed in 2004. The band plays a mix of melodic thrash metal and groove metal, influenced by bands such as Pantera, In Flames, Lamb of God and Soilwork. They have released one demo and three full albums and were the first Belgian band to sign with Roadrunner Records.

Spoil Engine directly supported bands such as Megadeth, Motörhead, Killswitch Engage, Arch Enemy and Prong. Major festival appearances include Graspop Metal Meeting (4x), Pukkelpop (2x),
Masters at Rock (2x) and Suikerrock (2x). 2 singles have appeared in the national charts; videoclips and songs have national airplay.

In 2017 and 2018, the band gained international visibility through tours in Europe and Asia, with tour supports for Prong and Papa Roach. Major appearances included MIDI festival in China and Wacken Open Air. They also performed on the 2020 70000 Tons of Metal festival during that year's cruise to Cozumel.

Members 
 Steven 'gaze' Sanders – lead guitar (2004–present)
 Matthijs Quaars – drums (2011–present)
 Dave De Loco – bass (2017–present)

Discography

Albums 
 Skinnerbox v.07 (2007, Apache Records)
 Antimatter (2009, Roadrunner Records)
 The Art of Imperfection (2012, Universal)
 Stormsleeper (2017, Arising Empire/Nuclear Blast)
 Renaissance Noire (2019, Arising Empire/Nuclear Blast)

EPs 
 Stormsleeper (2015, Daily Sin Entertainment)

Demos 
 The Fragile Light Before Ignition (2006, self-released)

See also 
 List of Roadrunner Records artists

External links 

Spoil Engine official website
Spoil Engine at Encyclopaedia Metallum
Spoil Engine at Last.fm

References 

2004 establishments in Belgium
Belgian heavy metal musical groups
Musical groups established in 2004
Musical quintets
Melodic death metal musical groups
Arising Empire artists